Shulani is a rural locality (a selo) and the administrative centre of Shulaninsky Selsoviet, Gunibsky District, Republic of Dagestan, Russia. The population was 745 as of 2010. There are 2 streets.

Geography 
Shulani is located 23 km south of Gunib (the district's administrative centre) by road. Unty and Batsada are the nearest rural localities.

Nationalities 
Avars live there.

References 

Rural localities in Gunibsky District